Madison Lake State Park is a public recreation area located  east of London in the Darby Plains region of Madison County, Ohio, United States.

History
The lake was formed in 1947 when the Madison Lake Dam was built on Deer Creek. The site was handed over to the Ohio Department of Natural Resources for use as a state park in 1950.

Activities and amenities
The park offers a boat ramp,  sand beach, changing booths and restrooms, picnic areas, and shelters. A mile-long hiking trial skirts the lake's southern shore. The lake's northern end is reserved for hunting migratory game birds. The park is a popular fishing location, with bass, bluegill, crappie, and channel catfish found in the lake.

References

External links
 Madison Lake State Park Ohio Department of Natural Resources 
Madison Lake State Park Map Ohio Department of Natural Resources

Protected areas of Madison County, Ohio
State parks of Ohio
Protected areas established in 1950
1950 establishments in Ohio